Red orache (also spelled orach) is a common name of at least two related plants:

 Atriplex hortensis
 Atriplex rosea, native to Eurasia

Flora of Europe
Flora of Asia
Atriplex